The Passerby (French: La Passante) is a French drama film from 1951, written and directed by Henri Calef, starring Henri Vidal and Louis de Funès. The scenario is based on Serge Groussard's novel La Femme sans passé.

Cast 
 Henri Vidal: François Malard, captain of the houseboat
 Maria Mauban: Madeleine Lemoine - "Mado"
 Daniel Ivernel: Jeanjean, the seaman on the houseboat
 Jane Marken: Mrs Pomont
 Noël Roquevert: Mr Pomont
 Dora Doll: Irma
 Marcelle Géniat: Mrs Iturbe
 Jean Marchat: Maître Darbel
 Annette Poivre: Jeannette
 Robert Dalban: the trafficker
 Pierre Sergeol: the policeman
 Louis de Funès: the lockmaster
 Colette Georges: Miss Pomont
 Solange Certain: Paulette

References

Bibliography
 Vincendeau, Ginette . Stars and Stardom in French Cinema. Bloomsbury Publishing, 2000.

External links 
 

1951 films
French drama films
1950s French-language films
French black-and-white films
Films set in Paris
Films directed by Henri Calef
Films scored by Marcel Landowski
1951 drama films
1950s French films